Events from the year 1849 in Scotland.

Incumbents

Law officers 
 Lord Advocate – Andrew Rutherfurd
 Solicitor General for Scotland – Thomas Maitland

Judiciary 
 Lord President of the Court of Session and Lord Justice General – Lord Boyle
 Lord Justice Clerk – Lord Glencorse

Events 
 19 February – Theatre Royal disaster: 65 people, almost all under the age of 20, are crushed to death in a panic caused by a small fire in the Theatre Royal, Dunlop Street, Glasgow.
 16 July – Portpatrick to Donaghadee packet service withdrawn.
 5 October – after three years construction, the Ardnamurchan Lighthouse oil light is first exhibited.
 1 November – Buchanan Street railway station opened in Glasgow by the Caledonian Railway.
 Pollokshields is established as a Glasgow southside suburb by the Stirling-Maxwell family and set out or 'feued' by Edinburgh architect David Rhind.
 The drapers' store of Arthur & Fraser, predecessor of the House of Fraser, is established in Glasgow by Hugh Fraser and James Arthur.

Births 
 27 May – Catherine Cranston, tearoom proprietor (died 1934)
 24 September – Cathcart William Methven, harbour engineer and painter (died 1925 in South Africa)
 23 October – James Reid, physician (died 1923)
 29 December – William Cunningham, economist and economic historian (died 1919)

Deaths 
 5 March – David Scott, historical painter (born 1806)
 3 July – Anthony Todd Thomson, physician and pioneer of dermatology (born 1778)

See also 
 Timeline of Scottish history
 1849 in the United Kingdom

References 

 
Years of the 19th century in Scotland
Scotland
1840s in Scotland